Sofia Beggin (born 12 October 1997) is an Italian professional racing cyclist, who last rode for UCI Women's Team .

See also
 List of 2016 UCI Women's Teams and riders

References

External links
 

1997 births
Living people
Italian female cyclists
Cyclists from the Province of Padua
Youth Olympic gold medalists for Italy
Cyclists at the 2014 Summer Youth Olympics